Anders Skaarup Rasmussen (born 15 February 1989) is a Danish badminton player. He joined the Denmark winning team at the 2016 Thomas Cup in Kunshan, China, where he and his teammates beating Indonesia 3–2 in the final. Rasmussen won the men's doubles title at the 2018 European Championships partnered with Kim Astrup.

Career 

Rasmussen competed at the 2020 Summer Olympics in the men's doubles partnering Kim Astrup. The duo were eliminated in the quarter-finals to Li Junhui and Liu Yuchen.

Achievements

World Championships 
Men's doubles

European Games 
Men's doubles

European Championships 
Men's doubles

BWF World Tour (3 titles, 3 runners-up) 
The BWF World Tour, which was announced on 19 March 2017 and implemented in 2018, is a series of elite badminton tournaments sanctioned by the Badminton World Federation (BWF). The BWF World Tour is divided into levels of World Tour Finals, Super 1000, Super 750, Super 500, Super 300, and the BWF Tour Super 100.

Men's doubles

BWF Grand Prix (3 titles, 4 runners-up) 
The BWF Grand Prix had two levels, the Grand Prix and Grand Prix Gold. It was a series of badminton tournaments sanctioned by the Badminton World Federation (BWF) and played between 2007 and 2017.

Men's doubles

Mixed doubles

  BWF Grand Prix Gold tournament
  BWF Grand Prix tournament

BWF International Challenge/Series (13 titles, 6 runners-up)
Men's doubles

Mixed doubles

  BWF International Challenge tournament
  BWF International Series tournament

Record against selected opponents 
Men's doubles results with Kim Astrup against Year-end Finals finalists, World Championships semifinalists, and Olympic quarterfinalists. Accurate as of 11 December 2022.

References

External links 
 
 

1989 births
Living people
People from Odder Municipality
Danish male badminton players
Badminton players at the 2020 Summer Olympics
Olympic badminton players of Denmark
Badminton players at the 2019 European Games
European Games silver medalists for Denmark
European Games medalists in badminton
Sportspeople from the Central Denmark Region
21st-century Danish people